The State Committee for Television and Radio-Broadcasting of Ukraine is a central body of executive power with a special status, activities of which are directed and coordinated by the Cabinet of Ministers of Ukraine. Derzhkomteleradio of Ukraine is the main in the system of central bodies of the executive power in formation and realization of the state policy in the sphere of television, radio-broadcasting, informational and publishing spheres. For short it is better known as the Derzhkomteleradio (Держкомтелерадіо).

Infrastructure
 National Public Broadcasting Company of Ukraine (channel "Pershyi Natsionalnyi")
 National Radio Company of Ukraine "Ukrainske Radio"
 The territorial-based broadcasting companies are abbreviated as ODTRK which stands for the Regional State Television Radio Company.
 There are 27 ODTRKs in each region of Ukraine
 Ukrainian Studio of Television Films "Ukrtelefilm"
 State Television and Radio Broadcasting Company Culture (DTRK) "Kultura"
 Ukrainian Television and Radio (International service "Ukrainian television and radio broadcasting")
 State Municipal Television and Radio Company "Siverska"
 Kryvorizke Municipal State Union of Television and Radiobroadcasting
 20 publishing agencies

Supporting establishments
 State enterprise Publishing and printing house "Tavrida"
 State enterprise Information-Analytic Center "Donbasinform"
 State enterprise "Poliservis"
 State science institution "Ivan Fedorov's Book Chamber of Ukraine"
 State specialized enterprise "Ukrtelefilm"
 State specialized auto-transportational enterprise
 Ukrainian institute for improvement of qualification for workers of television, radio, and press (Ukrteleradiopresinstytut)
 All-Ukrainian information-cultural Center (Simferopol)
 State enterprise "Directory of festival-exhibition activities"
 State enterprise "State orchestra "RadioBand of Oleksandr Fokin"

References

External links 
 Official Website of the State Committee in Television and Radio-broadcasting of Ukraine

Government agencies established in 2003
2003 establishments in Ukraine
Broadcasting authorities
Mass media in Ukraine
Government agencies of Ukraine
Presidency of Ukraine